JS Amakusa is a Hiuchi-class Auxiliary Multi-purpose Support (AMS) ship of the Japan Maritime Self-Defense Force (JMSDF).<ref>Werth, Eric. (2007). {{Google books|TJunjRvplU4C|Naval Institute Guide to Combat Fleets of the World, p. 392.|page=392}}</ref>

The ship was built by Universal in Keihin and commissioned into service on 16 March 2004. The primary mission of the Amakusa is to support training exercises of other ships, including shooting practice and torpedo launching practice.

Service
This ship was one of several in the JMSDF fleet participating in disaster relief after the 2011 Tohoku earthquake and tsunami. Akakusa was the second of two JMSDF ships which towed barges of fresh water from Yokosuka to the Fukushima I nuclear accidents. The water was used to replace the seawater being used in cooling efforts at the plant.

On 22 May 2022, the Amakusa conducted surveillance on a PLAN destroyer near Miyako Island. 

Notes

References
 Werth, Eric. (2007). Naval Institute Guide to Combat Fleets of the World: Their Ships, Aircraft, and Systems.''  Annapolis: Naval Institute Press. ;

External links

 JMSDF,  AMS-4303 あまくさ Amakusa

Hiuchi-class support ships
2003 ships